Ecleora solieraria is a moth in the family Geometridae. It is found in France, Andorra and Spain.

The wingspan is about 30 mm.

The larvae feed on Cupressus and Juniperus species.

References

External links

Lepiforum.de

Moths described in 1834
Boarmiini
Moths of Europe
Taxa named by Jules Pierre Rambur